The Oldfield Baronetcy, of Spalding in the County of Lincoln, was a title in the Baronetage of England. It was created on 6 August 1660 for Anthony Oldfield, High Sheriff of Lincolnshire. The title became extinct on the death of the second Baronet in 1705.

Oldfield baronets, of Spalding (1660)
Sir Anthony Oldfield, 1st Baronet (1626–1668)
Sir John Oldfield, 2nd Baronet (1659–1705)

References

Extinct baronetcies in the Baronetage of England